O'Ree is a surname. 

People with this surname include: 

 Matt O'Ree (born 1972) U.S. musician, member of Bon Jovi
 Willie O'Ree (born 1935) Canadian ice hockey player, first black African player to play in the NHL

See also

 Owen Rees (18th century) of T.N. Longman and O. Rees
 Matt O'Ree Band, U.S. music band formed by Matt O'Ree 
 
 Oree (disambiguation)
 Ree (disambiguation)